Charles M. Fisher (September 8, 1899 – May 16, 1966) was a member of the Wisconsin State Assembly. He was elected in 1944 as a Democrat.

Charles lived in  Fifield, Wisconsin.

He is buried there, at the Forest Home Cemetery.

References

2. http://wisconsinobits.tributes.com/obituary/show/Charles-Fisher-44398636

1899 births
1966 deaths
20th-century American politicians
Democratic Party members of the Wisconsin State Assembly